Saint-Germain-l'Aiguiller is a former commune in the Vendée department in the Pays de la Loire region in western France. On 1 January 2016, it was merged into the new commune of Mouilleron-Saint-Germain.

See also
Communes of the Vendée department

References

Former communes of Vendée